A list of Hong Kong films released in 2015:

See also
 2015 in Hong Kong

References

External links
 IMDB list of Hong Kong films 
 Hong Kong films of 2015 at HKcinemamagic.com

2015
Films
Hong Kong